The Seventh Goa Assembly (term : 2017-2022) was the unicameral legislature of the state of Goa in western India. It consists of 40 members. In charge of the budget, the Assembly appropriates money for social programs, agricultural development, infrastructure development, etc. It was also responsible for proposing and levying taxes.

The Assembly met in the Goa State Legislative Assembly Complex in Porvorim, Bardez.

History

Elections

Defections 
 
In July 2019 fourteen members of Indian National Congress switched their parties and joined Bharatiya Janata Party.

List of speakers

Composition of the assembly
 

|- bgcolor="#E9E9E9" align="center"
! style="text-align:left;" colspan="2" | Parties and coalitions
! colspan="1"| Seats
|-
| 
| align="left"| Bharatiya Janata Party (BJP)
| 13
|-
| 
| align="left"| Indian National Congress (INC)
| 17 
|-
| 
| align="left"| Maharashtrawadi Gomantak Party (MAG)
| 3 
|-
| 
| align="left"| Independents (IND)
| 3 
|-
| bgcolor="#353982"|
| align="left"| Goa Forward Party (GFP)
| 3
|-
| 
| align="left"| Nationalist Congress Party (NCP)
| 1 
|-
| colspan="7" bgcolor="#E9E9E9"|
|- style="font-weight:bold;"
| align="left" colspan="2"| Total
| 40 
|-
! colspan="9" |
|-

Members of Legislative Assembly 

The list of MLAs after the 2017 election until the end of 2021 is shown below. In July 2019 ten members of Indian National Congress switched their parties and joined Bharatiya Janata Party.

End of Seventh Assembly
In December 2021- January 2022, as the term of the seventh assembly came near to the end, several MLAs resigned and switched parties before the next elections. They were 
 Siolim : Resignation by Vinoda Paliencar
 Saligao : Resignation by Jayesh Salgaonkar
 Calangute : Resignation by Michael Lobo
 Porvorim : Resignation by Rohan Khaunte 
 Maem: Resignation by Pravin Zantye 
 Priol : Resignation by Govind Gaude
 Ponda : Resignation by Ravi Naik 
 Vasco da Gama : Resignation by Carlos Almeida 
 Cortalim : Resignation by Alina Saldanha
 Nuvem : Resignation by Wilfred D'sa
 Curtorim : Resignation by Aleixo Lourenco 
 Benaulim's MLA Churchill Alemao switched from NCP to All India Trinamool Congress (AITC)
 Navelim : Resignation by Luizinho Faleiro
 Velim : Resignation by Filipe Nery Rodrigues 
 Sanvordem : Resignation by Deepak Pauskar
 Sanguem : Resignation by Prasad Gaonkar
 Canacona : Resignation by Isidore Fernandes

References

External links
 Goa Lok Sabha Election 2019 Results Website
Goa Legislature official site

7
Goa MLAs 2017–2022